The Purús Communal Reserve (Reserva Communal Purús) is a protected area in the Amazonian part of Peru. Located in the Madre de Dios Region and in the Ucayali Region, it is a buffer zone between national parks and other areas.

External links 
 www.inrena.gob.pe / Áreas Naturales Protegidas (Spanish)

Communal reserves of Peru
Geography of Madre de Dios Region
Geography of Ucayali Region